Federalism is a form of government.

Federalism may also refer to:

Politics
 World federalism

Africa
 Federalism in Nigeria
 Federalism in South Africa

Americas
 Canadian federalism
 Federalism in Quebec
 Federalism in the United States

Asia 

 Federalism in China
 Federalism in India
 Federalism in Iraq
 Korean federalism
 Federalism in Malaysia
 Federalism in the Philippines
 Federalism in Sri Lanka
 Federalism in Nepal

Europe
 Balkan federalism
 Belgian federalism
 European federalism
 Federalism in Germany
 Iberian federalism
 Imperial Federalism, of the British Empire
 Russian federalism

Elsewhere
 Federalism in Australia

See also
 
 New Federalism, in the US
 Journal of Federalism
 Anti-Federalism, in the US
 Dual federalism, in the US
 Federal (disambiguation)
 Federation (disambiguation)
 Federalist (disambiguation)
 Federal Union (disambiguation)